The Canadian Extreme Wrestling Party (CEWP) was a frivolous political party in Canada that was not registered as an official party by Elections Canada, the government agency that conducts the Canadian elections.

The party held its leadership convention in Conception Bay South, Newfoundland. This was the first leadership convention to be held in Newfoundland for any federal party in the history of confederation.

History

In the fall of 1999, a young professional wrestler named Quentin Barboni beat out 11 other wrestlers, including Mike "Bulldozer" Dror and Norman Tharx, in a Battle Royale to become the first leader of the Canadian Extreme Wrestling Party.

The organization formed a National Executive and a Canadian Extreme Wrestling Woman's Auxiliary. "Miss Marilyn" was the Woman's Auxiliary's Secretary.

Party officials held news conferences with reporters and conducted interviews with the media. The party issued over thirty pages of policy statements to the media. The policy of the party was decidedly left wing. Policy included: the issue of overfishing in Canadian waters, regional development, Canada withdrawing from the North Atlantic Treaty Organization (NATO) and becoming neutral, and a "Guaranteed Annual Income" for all Canadians.

In the April 2000 by-election in the federal riding of St. John's West, Newfoundland, "Sailor King Moondog White" — a former World Wrestling Federation (WWF) wrestler — stood as an independent candidate for the Canadian Extreme Wrestling Party. Ed Sailor White's campaign slogan was "Parliament needs a Moondog."

In an interview with the Newfoundland Herald, Sailor White stated:

"I know exactly what they want. What they don't need is gun control. We need the seal hunt. We should be able to get in our boats at any time; we've got the God-given right to go out and get a fish any time we want. When I get to Ottawa this is what I'm going to be fighting for. I'm going to represent Newfoundland to the best of my ability, I'm going to stand up for Newfoundland and I'm going to wear the Newfoundland flag."

Canada's Minister of Human Resources Development, Jane Stewart, mentioned the CEWP in Canada's House of Parliament in 2000. Lorne Nystrom (Member of Parliament for Regina—Qu'Appelle) also referred to the CEWP in the House of Commons. On May 12, 2000, a Member of the Nova Scotia House of Assembly mentioned the CEWP in Resolution 2006 in the Nova Scotia Hansard.

See also
List of political parties in Canada

References

External links
CBC.ca 16 May 2000

Federal political parties in Canada
Joke political parties in Canada
Political parties with year of establishment missing
Political parties with year of disestablishment missing
Professional wrestling in Canada